Young T & Bugsey are an English hip hop duo from Nottingham consisting of rappers Ra'chard "Young T" Tucker and Doyin "Bugsey" Julius.

History
Young T & Bugsey began gaining attention in 2016 with singles such as "Glistenin'" and "No Mickey Mouse Ting", as well as "Gangland" and "4x4" in 2017. In 2018, they released multiple singles including "Greenlight", "Ay Caramba", "En Route", and "Living Gravy". They rose to prominence outside the UK with their song "Don't Rush" going viral on TikTok. On 20 March 2020, they released their debut mixtape Plead the 5th, with singles including "Strike a Pose" and "Bully Beef". On 21 January 2022, the duo released their second mixtape Truth Be Told, supported by the singles "Prada Bae", "Big Bidness", "Roberto C", "Blessings", and "Nice".

Members
 Young T (born Ra'chard Tucker in Nottingham, England – 9 May 1997)
 Bugsey (born Doyin Julius in Ibadan, Nigeria – 7 March 1997)

Discography

Mixtapes

Singles

As lead artist

As featured artist

Guest appearances

Filmography

Short

Television

Awards and nominations

References

English hip hop groups
English musical duos
Hip hop duos
Male musical duos
Musical groups from Nottinghamshire
People from Nottingham
Black Butter Records artists
Sony Music UK artists